was the founder of the Yamaguchi-gumi, which grew to become Japan's largest and most powerful yakuza organization.

Yamaguchi established the group in Kobe in 1915, and was its kumicho or Godfather until 1925 when he was succeeded by his son Noboru Yamaguchi.

Yamaguchi died at the age of 57.

References

External links 
 Yamaguchi-gumi Split Signals Changes in the Yakuza World

Yakuza members
Yamaguchi-gumi
Japanese crime bosses
People from Hyōgo Prefecture
Kobe
1881 births
1938 deaths